Take a Breath is the debut album by the Geneva-based punk rock band Hateful Monday, released in 2004 through Hannibal's Records. This is the first release with new guitarist Greg Laraigne.

Track listing

Personnel
Hateful Monday
Reverend Seb – vocals, bass guitar
Igor Gonzola – drums
Greg Laraigne – guitar
Myriam K. - guitar, backing vocals

Artwork
Nick Talop - design

Production
Elias Siddiqui – mastering

2004 albums
Hateful Monday albums